Aq Bulagh (also Romanized as Āq Būlāgh; also known as Āgh Bolāgh, Ak-Bulag, Āq Bolāgh, Āqbolāgh-e Kord, and Āqbulāq) is a village in Sanjabad-e Sharqi Rural District, in the Central District of Khalkhal County, Ardabil Province, Iran. At the 2006 census, its population was 559, in 109 families.

References 

Towns and villages in Khalkhal County